Susie Revels Cayton (1870 – 1943) was a writer, editor, activist, and leader in the Black community in Seattle at the start of the 20th century.

Biography

Early life  
Susie Sumner Revels was born in Mississippi in 1870, the same year her father, Hiram Revels, became the first Black senator in US history. Revels' middle name "Sumner" was a tribute Charles Sumner, Hiram Revels' friend, who was sworn in as the Massachusetts senator the year Susie was born. Hiram Revels escorted Sumner at his swearing-in ceremony.

Beginning at age 16, Revels taught school. In 1889 she began studying at Rust College, graduating with honors in 1893 with a degree in "nurse training," then teaching at the college for three years after graduation. The Revels family connection to Rust College was strong: her father taught theology classes there, and her sisters
Ida and Maggie were also alumnae.

Career as a writer, journalist, and editor 
Revels met her future husband, Horace Cayton, in Mississippi around 1881, when she was only eleven years old and Horace was courting her older sister Lillie. After moving to Seattle, Cayton corresponded at length with Revels' father; Susie's increasingly long postscripts and Cayton's responses eventually amounted to a correspondence between Cayton and Susie herself. After a period of long distance letter writing she followed him to Seattle in 1896, living in separate lodgings until they could be married in July of the same year. She had started writing for his Seattle-based newspaper, The Seattle Republican, before leaving Mississippi, and eventually became associate editor in 1900 and continued working at the paper until it folded in 1913. Given that her husband sometimes traveled out of state, there were times when that associate editor role essentially meant putting out a newspaper.

Revels and her husband were both light-skinned which, in the words of Richard S. Hobbs, "clearly played a role in the Caytons' early acceptance in Seattle." However, as Seattle grew, it became a less hospitable place for African Americans. The Seattle Republican had never exactly been a "black paper," it had been a black-edited Republican paper. As race relations deteriorated, fewer white people wanted to read a black-edited paper, and the paper never quite crossed over into being the newspaper specifically of the Black community. This (and some unsuccessful real estate speculation) led to a general decline in the Cayton's fortunes after 1907 or so, with them selling their Capitol Hill house in 1909 (pushed out in part by increasing pressure for residential segregation) and shuttering The Seattle Republican in 1913. Revels and her husband started another newspaper Cayton's Weekly, in 1916, which targeted the Black community in Seattle. The paper ran until 1920 when it was replaced by Cayton's Monthly which only ran for two issues.

In addition to her journalistic writing, Revels wrote short stories which appeared in The Seattle Republican, Cayton's Weekly, and the Seattle Post-Intelligencer.

Later life 
In 1919, at the age of 49, Susie Revels Cayton was forced to seek employment as a "domestic" as the family experienced economic hardships. 

In her sixties, she became politically active and joined the Communist Party, after being introduced to the organization by her son, Revels Cayton, and was considered "one of the state's most prominent African American radicals". She joined the Communist Party in reaction to Depression-era Seattle, believing that only radical political change could address economic inequality.

She became friends with activists Paul Robeson and Langston Hughes, and was admired by Richard Wright. Langston Hughes dedicated a poem, Dear Mr. President, to her.

Revels Cayton moved to Chicago in 1942, two years after her husband died, to be closer to her children. She continued advocating for progressive politics and communism to promote equality until she died in July 1943.

Charitable work 

 The Dorcas Club of Seattle, founding member and leader
Founded by Revels Cayton in 1910, the Dorcas Club of Seattle was a group of Black women dedicated to improving the social conditions of Seattle. This included finding homes for orphans and helping widows with living expenses.
 Skid Row Unemployed Council, Secretary
 Negro Workers Council, Vice President

Children 
Susie Revels Cayton had five children with Horace Cayton Sr. They had two sons, activists Horace Cayton, Jr. and Revels Cayton. Their oldest daughter, Ruth. Second daughter, Madge, who was one of the first African American women to graduate from the University of Washington and a social worker. And a third daughter, Lillie. They also adopted their granddaughter, Susan, after Ruth passed away in 1919, and raised her as their youngest child.

Legacy 

In 1992 the Cayton Scholarship was established to honor both Susie and Horace Cayton. This scholarship is available to minority students in Washington state pursuing a public relations career.

In 1902 Revels Cayton and her husband had a house built in Seattle's prosperous Capitol Hill neighborhood. They lived there from 1903 to 1909. In 2021 Seattle's Landmarks Preservation Board designated the house as a historic landmark.

Published works 
 The Part She Played, short story
Licker, short story 
The Storm, short story

External links 
 Seattle Republican: Northwest Negro Progress Number published by H.R. Cayton and Susie Revels Cayton
Susan Cayton Woodson Papers

References 

African-American women writers
1943 deaths
1870 births
Writers from Seattle
Rust College alumni
African-American history of Washington (state)
Writers from Mississippi
Activists for African-American civil rights
African-American communists
African-American history in Seattle